The Kearns-St. Ann's Orphanage, at 430 East 2100 South in South Salt Lake, Utah, was built in 1890.  It was designed by architect Carl M. Neuhausen.  Later serving as Kearns-Saint Ann Catholic School, it was listed on the National Register of Historic Places in 1980.
According to its NRHP nomination, the orphanage is significant partly for its architecture, with "modest decorative elements allud[ing] to Renaissance and Mannerist" styles, representing "the important educational and religious contributions to Utah society of Bishop Lawrence Scanlan and Thomas and Jennie Kearns".

References

Residential buildings on the National Register of Historic Places in Utah
School buildings completed in 1890
Buildings and structures in South Salt Lake, Utah
School buildings on the National Register of Historic Places in Utah
National Register of Historic Places in Salt Lake County, Utah